Davide Frattesi (born 22 September 1999) is an Italian professional footballer who plays as midfielder for  club Sassuolo and the Italy national team.

Club career

Sassuolo 
On 20 December 2017, Frattesi made his professional debut in a 2–1 away defeat against Serie A club Atalanta in the round of 16 of Coppa Italia, he was replaced by Matteo Politano in the 74th minute. In that season he made also several bench appearances for Sassuolo's senior team, but he did not appear on the field.

Loan to Ascoli 
On 16 August 2018, Frattesi joined to Serie B side Ascoli on loan until 30 June 2019. Ten days later, on 26 August, he made his Serie B debut for Ascoli as a substitute replacing Tomasz Kupisz in the 57th minute of a 1–1 home draw against Cosenza. One week later, on 2 September, Frattesi played his first match as a starter, a 2–0 away defeat against Perugia, he was replaced after 61 minutes by Enrico Baldini. On 15 September he played his first entire match for Ascoli, a 1–0 home win over Lecce. Frattesi ended his season-long loan to Ascoli with 33 appearances, including 26 of them as a starter, and 2 assists.

Loan to Empoli 
On 15 July 2019, Frattesi was signed by Serie B club Empoli on a season-long loan deal. On 11 August he made his debut for the club as a substitute replacing Filippo Bandinelli in the 46th minute of a 2–1 home win against Reggina in the second round of Coppa Italia. On 25 August he made his league debut for Empoli as a substitute replacing Karim Laribi in the 72nd minute of a 2–1 home win over Juve Stabia. On 21 September, he played his first match as a starter for the club, a 1–0 home win over Cittadella and three days later his first entire match, a 3–2 away win over Pisa, where he also scored his first professional goal and the winning goal in the 95th minute. Frattesi ended his season-long loan to Empoli with 41 appearances, 5 goals and 4 assists.

Loan to Monza 
On 16 September 2020, Frattesi joined newly-promoted Serie B side Monza on a one-year loan. On 25 September he made his league debut for the club as a substitute replacing Marco Armellino for the last 17 minutes of a 0–0 home draw against SPAL. On 20 October he played his first match as a starter for the club in Serie B, where he scored his first goal for Monza in the 46th minute of a 1–1 away draw against Pisa. Four days later, on 24 October, Frattesi played his first entire match, a 2–1 home defeat against Chievo.

On 1 May 2021, Frattesi scored his eighth goal for Monza against Salernitana;  winning a personal bet he made with coach Cristian Brocchi. Frattesi was nominated in the Serie B Team of the Season, finishing the season with eight goals and two assists.

International career 
With the Italy U17 he took part in the 2016 UEFA European Under-17 Championship.

With the Italy U19 he took part in the 2018 UEFA European Under-19 Championship, and scored two goals in the tournament, including one in the 4–3 final loss against Portugal after extra time.

The following year he took part in the 2019 FIFA U-20 World Cup with the Italy U20 squad, reaching the fourth place.

He made his debut with the Italy U21 squad on 6 September 2019, scoring two goals as a substitute in the friendly match won 4–0 against Moldova.

He was selected in the senior Italy squad for the 2022 Finalissima against Argentina on 1 June 2022 and for 2022–23 UEFA Nations League group stage matches against Germany, Hungary, England and Germany between 4 and 14 June 2022.

Career statistics

Club

International

Honours
Roma Primavera
 Campionato Nazionale Primavera: 2016–17
 Supercoppa Primavera: 2017

Italy U19
UEFA European Under-19 Championship runner-up: 2018

Italy U20
FIFA U-20 World Cup fourth place: 2019

Individual
 Serie B Team of the Season: 2020–21

References

1999 births
Living people
Footballers from Rome
Italian footballers
Italy international footballers
Italy under-21 international footballers
Italy youth international footballers
Association football midfielders
Serie A players
Serie B players
U.S. Sassuolo Calcio players
Ascoli Calcio 1898 F.C. players
Empoli F.C. players
A.C. Monza players